Conni Ellisor (born September 25, 1953) is a contemporary American composer and violinist.  She was trained at The Juilliard School and the University of Denver's University of Denver, Lamont School of Music, and rose to prominence as Composer-in-Residence of the Nashville Chamber Orchestra in the late 1990s.  As a violinist, she has served as a member of the Denver Symphony, concertmaster of the Boulder Philharmonic, first violin in the Athena Quartet (now the Colorado Quartet),  and is now a top-call studio musician and member of the Nashville String Machine.

Orchestral repertoire
Ellisor’s contributions to the orchestral repertoire include such uniquely American works as Blackberry Winter for mountain dulcimer and strings, and Whiskey Before Breakfast – Partita for Bluegrass Band and Strings. Blackberry Winter has generated widespread NPR airplay and was featured on All Things Considered. Her long and productive association with the Nashville Chamber Orchestra resulted in the premieres of 11 of her works.  Three were recorded for broadcast by NPR’s Performance Today, and her “Conversations In Silence” became the title track on the orchestra’s 1997 debut album on Warner Bros.  NPR Senior Producer Benjamin Roe’s comment that “the NCO truly is what’s new in classical music” is a testament to Ellisor’s groundbreaking contributions to the group’s repertoire.  Among the pieces commissioned by the NCO was "Sea Without A Shore," written for orchestra, marimba and percussion and premiered by the NCO, Christopher Norton and world-renowned percussion ensemble Nexus. Other of her works have been premiered and recorded by the St. Paul Chamber Orchestra, London Symphony, Nexus Chamber Orchestra, Denver Brass, Camelli Quartet, New York Treble Singers, Hamburg Radio Orchestra and the London Philharmonic.

Recent commissions
Recent commissions and premieres include “Diaspora” by the Nashville Symphony (2011), her second concerto for mountain dulcimer and orchestra, “Broad Band of Light”, by the Tucson Symphony (2012), "Tres Danzas De Vida" by the Arlington (NY) High School Philharmonia Orchestra (2013), “Fort of Shadows” by the Arlington High School Sinfonia Orchestra (2014), and “The Bass Whisperer”, a concerto for electric bass written with and for 5x Grammy-winning bassist Victor Wooten and commissioned by the Nashville Symphony, the Colorado Symphony, and the Chicago Sinfonietta (2015/2016). She has also written and recorded the score for the SONY/Affirm film All Saints (2017) with composer/multi-instrumentalist (and husband) John Mock, through their production company, Drowsy Maggie Productions. Conni Ellisor’s works are represented by LeDor Publishing.

Selected works
 Beloved Enemy - solo voice and strings (written with Gretchen Peters)
 Blackberry Winter - solo dulcimer and strings
 Broad Band of Light - solo dulcimer and orchestra
 Concerto for Marimba, Percussion and Strings
 Conversations In Silence - string orchestra
 Diaspora - orchestra
 No Place To Get To - strings, English horns, guitar (also available for string quartet, guitar, and English horn or clarinet)
 Nuages de la Nuit - violin, bass, two guitars, and strings
 Rhapsody for Viola - solo viola, strings, single winds, trumpet, percussion
 Sea Without A Shore - marimba, five percussion, and orchestra
 The Bass Whisperer - solo electric bass and orchestra (written with Victor L. Wooten)
 The Bell Witch Ballet - orchestra
 Tres Danzas De Vida - orchestra
 Whiskey Before Breakfast - bluegrass band and chamber orchestra
 Wind From The Mountain - brass ensemble and percussion

Educator
Ellisor has written multiple works for the Arlington (NY) High School Philharmonia Orchestra and recently completed a three-year residency with Stringendo, a nonprofit community strings program in upstate New York.  The partnership has resulted in seven new works for varying levels of string orchestra.

Educational compositions
 Air For the Dutchess
 Bell Witch Dance Suite
 Fiddlers On The Hudson
 Fort of Shadows
 Poughkeepsie Blues
 River That Runs Both Ways
 Rousing Rip Van Winkle
 Rowing Under A Hudson Moon

Contemporary jazz
Ellisor has also had a career as a contemporary jazz recording artist.  Her “Night at the Museum” album, one of four solo albums she’s released, climbed to #13 on Billboard’s Adult Alternative chart.  Her studio albums and live performances have both garnered  critical praise.  “While the pieces all have a contemporary, accessible feel, the consistent classical nuances help maintain the warmth and humanity that make this such a special collection of music,” wrote a critic for the Exclusive Adult Music Review.  Venerable Nashville music critic Robert Oermann encouraged readers to attend an upcoming concert, commenting that “Conni and her all-star group combine classical training with contemporary melodies.  Her performances are soundtracks for mental movies that transport the listener to parts unknown.”

References

External links
 ellisormusic.com

Living people
American women composers
1953 births
21st-century American women